Francisco Pedro Manuel Sá (born 25 October 1945, in  Las Lomitas, Formosa) is a retired Argentine football defender.

Sá holds the record for the most Copa Libertadores titles, he won six; 4 consecutive titles with Club Atlético Independiente between 1972 and 1975, and a further 2 with Boca Juniors in 1977 and 1978.

Career
Sá started his career with Central Goya in the lower leagues, he then had a spell with Huracán de Corrientes before joining River Plate in 1969.

In 1971 Sá joined Independiente where he was part of the team that won the Metropolitano 1971 title followed by an unprecedented four consecutive Copa Libertadores titles. He also won the first of his two Intercontinental Cup title in 1973.

In 1976 Sá was transferred to Boca Juniors where he won a further six major titles, 2 Metropolitano, 2 Copa Libertadores, 1 Nacional and 1 Intercontinental Cup. In his time at Boca he played 195 games for the club in all competitions, scoring 2 goals.

After leaving Boca in 1981 Sá played for Gimnasia de Jujuy for one season before his retirement in 1982.

Honours
Independiente
Argentine Primera División (1): Metropolitano 1971
Copa Libertadores (4): 1972, 1973, 1974, 1975
Intercontinental Cup (1): 1973

Boca Juniors
Argentine Primera División (2): Metropolitano 1976, Metropolitano 1981
Copa Libertadores (2): 1977, 1978
Intercontinental Cup (1): 1977

References

External links
 
Boca Juniors profile 

1945 births
Living people
People from Formosa Province
Argentine footballers
Argentina international footballers
Association football defenders
Huracán Corrientes footballers
Club Atlético River Plate footballers
Club Atlético Independiente footballers
Boca Juniors footballers
Gimnasia y Esgrima de Jujuy footballers
Argentine Primera División players
1974 FIFA World Cup players
Argentine football managers
Boca Juniors managers
C.D. Olimpia managers
Oriente Petrolero managers